Samuel Cutter Costen (May 18, 1882 – January 21, 1955) was an American football player and coach. Costen was a quarterback for Dan McGugin's Vanderbilt Commodores of Vanderbilt University. As a player, he weighed some 150 pounds. He was the third head football at The Citadel, serving two seasons, from 1909 to 1910, and compiling a record of 7–7–2.

Costen graduated from Vanderbilt in 1908 with an LL.B. degree. He was a member of Alpha Tau Omega.

Costen was the first head football coach at Blytheville High School in Blytheville, Arkansas, leading the team from 1913 to 1919. He died on January 21, 1955, in Memphis, Tennessee, where he had lived in the 1930s.

Head coaching record

References

External links
 

1882 births
1955 deaths
American football quarterbacks
The Citadel Bulldogs football coaches
Vanderbilt Commodores baseball players
Vanderbilt Commodores football players
High school football coaches in Arkansas
All-Southern college football players
People from McKenzie, Tennessee
Players of American football from Tennessee
Baseball players from Tennessee